Nisha Desai Biswal (born 1968) is an American businesswoman and public official in the United States. Biswal is the president of the U.S.-India Business Council (USIBC) and Senior Vice President for South Asia at the United States Chamber of Commerce. She previously served as Assistant Secretary of State for South and Central Asian Affairs in the United States Department of State under President Barack Obama from 2013 to 2017. Biswal was the first South-Asian American to hold this position. She oversaw the U.S.-India strategic partnership during a period of unprecedented cooperation, including the launch of an annual U.S.-India Strategic and Commercial Dialogue. Biswal was awarded the prestigious Samman Award by the President of India in January 2017.  Biswal was also instrumental in launching the US-Bangladesh Partnership Dialogue, the C5+1 Dialogue between the United States and the Central Asian States of Kazakhstan, Kyrgyzstan, Tajikistan, Turkmenistan and Uzbekistan. Biswal also serves on the United States Institute of Peace International Advisory Council, on the Afghanistan Study Group and is on the Board of Directors for the Institute for Sustainable Communities, the Leadership Council for Women in National Security and is active in Democratic politics.

Early life and education
Biswal immigrated to the United States from India with her parents. She earned a Bachelor of Arts degree in international relations from the University of Virginia.

Career
After briefly working in public relations, Biswal became an overseas delegate for the American Red Cross, serving in Armenia, Azerbaijan and Georgia. Biswal served as Assistant Administrator for Asia at the U.S. Agency for International Development (USAID), overseeing US development assistance programs and policies for the Asia-Pacific region. She also spent over a decade on Capitol Hill, working as staff director for State and Foreign Operations Subcommittee in House Appropriations Committee and as professional staff for the Foreign Affairs Committee in the House of Representatives.

She was nominated for the post of Assistant Secretary of State for South and Central Asia by President Barack Obama on July 19, 2013. Most recently, Biswal was senior advisor for Albright Stonebridge Group, a global business strategy firm. At ASG, she worked with the India & South Asia practice. Since 2011, Biswal has served as a member of the Congressional-Executive Commission on China.

Personal life 
Nisha Desai Biswal is an Indian American of Gujarati descent. Biswal lives in Washington D.C. with her husband, two daughters and their Aussiedoodle puppy, Izzy.

Awards

References

External links

Nisha Desai Biswal Profile on DC 40 Under 40 International Development Leaders

1968 births
Living people
American people of Gujarati descent
American politicians of Indian descent
American women diplomats
American diplomats
Recipients of Pravasi Bharatiya Samman
United States Department of State officials
University of Virginia alumni
21st-century American women